|}

This is a list of House of Assembly results for the 1992 Tasmanian election.

Results by division

Bass

Braddon

Denison

Franklin

Lyons

See also 

 1992 Tasmanian state election
 Candidates of the 1992 Tasmanian state election
 Members of the Tasmanian House of Assembly, 1992-1996

References 

Results of Tasmanian elections
1992 in Australia